Masih Zahedi; is an Iranian footballer who plays for Iranian club Mes Rafsanjan as a defender.

Club career

Paykan
He started his career with Paykan from youth levels.

Shahrdari Ardabil
Zahedi joined Shahrdari Ardabil in summer 2013, and helped them gain promotion to the 2014–15 Azadegan League.

Saipa
Zahedi joined Saipa in summer 2014. He made his debut for Saipa on 4 December 2014 against Naft MIS as a starter.

Club career statistics

References

External links
 Masih Zahedi at PersianLeague.com
 Masih Zahedi at IranLeague.ir

1993 births
Living people
Iranian footballers
Paykan F.C. players
Saipa F.C. players
People from Karaj
Association football defenders
Shahrdari Ardabil players
Mes Rafsanjan players
Machine Sazi F.C. players
Gostaresh Foulad F.C. players
21st-century Iranian people